Mercy Falls is the third studio album by Swedish progressive metal band Seventh Wonder. It is a concept album that tells the story of a victim of a car crash who, upon awakening from a coma, finds himself in the mysterious town of Mercy Falls, a fictional world he has dreamed up in his comatose state.

The album was released on September 12, 2008. The band announced on their website that the first 1000 copies to be sold would be limited edition copies, with an alternative cover and a bonus DVD containing video footage from the recording sessions as well as interviews with all band members about the new album and private photos from the entire recording process.

Track listing

Plot
A man has a mysterious car accident, and falls into a coma. He is taken to a hospital by paramedics. The man, in his comatose state, dreams he is in a place called Mercy Falls. A few years after the accident, his wife comes to visit him (as she apparently has been doing constantly ever since that night). She comments that the doctors are still trying to wake him. She leaves his side, but turns the radio on to comfort her husband.

Within the man's mind, he dreams of a woman who lives in Mercy Falls, who constantly stays locked inside "the tall house", an empty mansion that the children fear to approach. He begins to realize that she is a reflection of himself, because he is trapped inside his own empty mind and completely isolated from those he loves. He believes that if he can meet this woman and help her to leave her mansion, he will be able to leave Mercy Falls himself and finally see his family again.

Back in the physical world, the doctors speak to the man's wife and explain that they will harvest bone marrow from his son in desperate attempts to heal the man in the coma. This, apparently, is their last hope to try to awaken him.

Back in Mercy Falls, the townspeople prepare for a terrible storm that could destroy their village. (The storm, of course, is the doctors trying to cure the man using the bone marrow, therefore trying to destroy Mercy Falls.) The townspeople unite and build up defenses against the storm, and their town is saved. Therefore, the medical procedure has failed.

The man's wife and the doctors give up hope. At the album's emotional climax, "One Last Goodbye", they turn off his life-support machines and assure him that his memory will live on. He passes from Mercy Falls into the afterlife, and as he is dying, he has a flashback which reveals a conversation he had with his wife several years ago in the car. She told him that her son was, in truth, not his. Shocked so suddenly, he crashes the car, bringing the timeline back to the beginning of the album. This explains why the bone marrow transplant from his son was unsuccessful.

The son struggles with the absence of his father and his mother. The mother appears to be struggling with the guilt and turns to alcohol. The son refers to it as the "muddy water". Not only did she cause the accident in the first place by telling the man that the son he thought he had was not his, but the attempts to bring him out of his coma also failed because of her infidelities. She lets her son go through the pain of a bone marrow transplant even though she knew that it wouldn't work. She continues to keep her infidelity a secret.

The final song, "The Black Parade", tells of the man's experience passing into the afterlife.

Personnel
All information from the album booklet.

Seventh Wonder
Tommy Karevik – vocals
Andreas "Kyrt" Söderin – keyboard
Johan Liefvendahl – guitars
Andreas Blomqvist – bass guitar
Johnny Sandin – drums

Additional musician
Jenny Karevik – female vocals

Production
 Andreas Blomqvist – producer
 Tommy Hansen – mixing, mastering
 Daniel Flores – engineering, recording
 Johan Larsson – engineering, recording
 Carl-André Beckston – artwork

References

2008 albums
Seventh Wonder albums
Concept albums